Demonstration Multipurpose School (DMS), Mysore now officially known as Demonstration School, Mysore is one of the four schools which are spread across four cities in India (Bhopal, Bhubaneswar, Ajmer, and Mysore). Demonstration School is a coeducational school for day scholars in Mysore, India, founded by the Regional Institute of Education as a laboratory for the preparation of teachers and for trying out innovative practices in school education and teacher education. The school is surrounded by educational institutes like Sri Jayachamarajendra College of Engineering, All India Institute of Speech and Hearing, and Gangothri School, and is spread over 120 acres (490,000 m2) of land in the city of Mysore. School heads in the early days included T.G. Sathyanarayana and Nagaraja Chitradurga. The current head is Kalpana Venugopal (2014 - present).

The campus of the Demonstration school includes:

 a science park
 a basketball, football, throw ball, volleyball, field hockey, and badminton courts
 a farmhouse
 hostels and quarters (for college students and staff members)
 a library
 multiple gardens

Origins 

The Demonstration school of the Regional Institute of Education, Mysore is one of the most prestigious schools of Mysore City. The school has a teaching staff of 55 teachers and a student population of nearly 1000 students studying in classes I to XII. Besides carrying out the functions of typical school, it also functions as a laboratory for experimentation and tryout of new strategies and instructional training programs of the Institute. The school provides opportunities for the B.Sc. Ed. students to observe, learn and participate in teaching and serves as a center for the cooperative training and research endeavor of the staff of the Institute. The school is affiliated to the Central Board of Secondary Education (CBSE) and is known for its innovative approaches to teaching and evaluation and lay emphasis on the total development of the child’s personality. Competency Based Teaching (CBT) with an action research approach has been implemented in the school with effects from 1995 – 96.

Alumni
Established in 2009, DMS Mysore Alumni Association.

References

High schools and secondary schools in Mysore
Educational institutions established in 1964
1964 establishments in Mysore State